Venus is a 2022 Spanish action horror thriller film directed by Jaume Balagueró, loosely inspired by H. P. Lovecraft's short story "The Dreams in the Witch House". It stars Ester Expósito.

Plot 
Featuring according to Balagueró "terror, blood, aberrations and terribly bad people", the fiction is based on H. P. Lovecraft's "The Dreams in the Witch House", transferring the story to a "dirty, modern city" setting in the outskirts of Madrid, focusing on a cursed building in Villaverde Sur. Go-go dancer Lucía, on the run with a stash of pills and hunted by mobsters, takes sanctuary in an apartment block with sister Rocío and niece Alba only to find out that malevolent supernatural forces are at play in the building.

Cast

Production 
A part of 'The Fear Collection' horror film label, jointly set by Pokeepsie Films and Sony Pictures International Productions in association with Amazon Prime Video. The project was pitched at the Sitges Film Festival in October 2021, with the participation of the director Jaume Balagueró, star performer Ester Expósito as well as Álex de la Iglesia, Carolina Bang, Ricardo Cabornero and Iván Losada. The screenplay was penned by Balagueró alongside Fernando Navarro.  worked as cinematographer whereas  was responsible for editing. Filming began in November 2021 in Madrid. It moved to Toledo afterwards, shooting in the Santa María de Benquerencia neighborhood ("El Polígono"). Filming had already wrapped in February 2022.

Release 

The film had its world premiere at the Toronto International Film Festival's Midnight Madness section in September 2022. It will later have its US premiere at the Fantastic Fest. Likewise, it screened in the opening gala of the 55th Sitges Film Festival on 6 October 2022. It is set to be released theatrically in Spain on 2 December 2022 by Sony Pictures Entertainment.

Reception 
According to the American review aggregation website Rotten Tomatoes, Venus has a 77% approval rating based on 13 reviews from critics, with an average rating of 6.6/10.

Meagan Navarro of Bloody Disgusting rated the film 3½ stars deeming it to be a "slick and breezy action-horror movie far more memorable for its gruesome high-octane thrills than its cosmic chills".

Shelagh Rowan-Legg of ScreenAnarchy deemed the film to be "a highly enjoyable film with horror, crime, buckets of blood", "awesome crafty old ladies, a cute kid, and a kick-ass heroine".

Raquel Hernández Luján of HobbyConsolas rated the film with 58 out of 100 points ("so-so"), highlighting Expósito's absolute commitment to her role and the solid production design as positive elements, while lamenting what little is left of the original story and the little amount of cosmic horror, also pointing out that the film could have benefited from taking itself less seriously.

Ricardo Rosado of Fotogramas considered that the film, even if "replete with good intentions", struggles to find the right tone amid the pastiche story, also assessing that Expósito does her best, bearing the weight of the scenes while the film struggles to find its audience. Also reviewing for Fotogramas Desirée de Fez rated the film 4 out of 5 stars, highlighting the film's "tribute to the (many) women of horror cinema" as well as Ester Expósito as the best things about the film, otherwise deeming the film to be "frenetic and brutal", bringing together the hallmark of Balagueró's works: "the search for poisoned images that conceptually and formally enclose horror".

Miguel Ángel Romero of Cinemanía rated the film 3½ out of 5 stars, considering it to be a "triumphant" return of Balagueró to his horror origins, flaunting his ability to turn suspense into fantasy and horror.

See also 
 List of Spanish films of 2022

References

External links 
 

2022 horror films
2020s Spanish films
2020s Spanish-language films
2020s supernatural horror films
Films based on works by H. P. Lovecraft
Films set in Madrid
Films shot in Madrid
Films shot in the province of Toledo
Pokeepsie Films films
Spanish horror thriller films
Spanish supernatural horror films
Films directed by Jaume Balagueró
Films set in apartment buildings
Films about sisters